Knema glomerata is a species of plant in the family Myristicaceae. It is a tree found in Borneo, the Moluccas and the Philippines.

References

glomerata
Trees of Borneo
Trees of the Maluku Islands
Trees of the Philippines
Least concern plants
Taxonomy articles created by Polbot
Taxa named by Francisco Manuel Blanco